The Ford 8.8 is an automotive axle manufactured by Ford Motor Company  at the Sterling Axle Plant in Sterling Heights, MI. It was first used in model year 1983 Ford trucks.  The axle was developed to replace the Ford 9-inch axle.  This axle is still in production today for a variety of Ford vehicles.

General Specifications 

 Ring gear measures 8.8".
 28 Spline axle shafts with a 1.29" diameter
 31 Spline axle shafts with a 1.32" diameter
 Ratios:  2.26, 2.47, 2.73, 3.08, 3.27, 3.31, 3.45, 3.55, 3.73, 4.10, 4.56 & 5.14

8.8 Solid Axle
Ford first used the 8.8 axle in 1983 model year trucks and is still in production for the Ford Ranger and Ford F-Series.  It was also used in the Ford SUVs until Independent suspension replaced the solid axle.  Ring, pinion and carrier all remained between the solid axle and independent rear suspension.

The solid rear axle from 1995-2001 Explorers is a popular swap for older Jeep Wranglers and Cherokees. In addition to being nearly the same width, they have the same wheel bolt pattern, are equipped with disc brakes, and are much stronger than the Dana 35 they replace.

It was also used in V8 equipped Mustangs from 1986 to the 2014 model years; and all Mustang models from 2011-2014.

Super 8.8

Ford released an updated version in both solid and IRS form for 2015+ Mustangs and F-150. The most apparent difference is a 12 bolt cover instead of the traditional 10. The super 8.8 also uses larger bearings,longer pinion with larger nut, and most significantly 34 spline axles or half shafts.

8.8 Independent Suspension

8.8 IRS (Independent Rear Suspension)
The 8.8 IRS first saw use in the 1989 model year Ford Thunderbird and later Ford adapted independent suspension to its 3rd generation Explorer and 2nd generation Expedition SUVs.
The Mustang first used the 8.8 IRS on 1999-2004 Cobra models. The IRS became standard across the Mustang line for the 2015 model year with the "super 8.8."

8.8 IFS
The 8.8 IFS was first used in the 1997 model year Ford F-150 and Ford Expedition and has been in use ever since.

Common Applications 

1986-2014 Ford Mustang
1982-2012 Ford F-150
1982-1996 Ford Bronco
2001-2005 Ford Explorer Sport Trac
1991-2011 Ford Ranger 4.0L models
1991-2001 Ford Explorer (Solid axle)
1985-2011 Ford Panther platform vehicles
2012–Present Ford F-150 (Super 8.8, depending on engine and other options)
2003-2006 Ford Expedition front

References

Automotive engineering
Automobile axles